is a 1957 Japanese science fiction horror film produced and distributed by Daiei Film. It was Daiei's second film based on  H. G. Wells' 1897 The Invisible Man after The Invisible Man Appears. The film is directed by Mitsuo Murayama, with special effects by Tōru Matoba and stars Ryuji Shinagawa, Yoshiro Kitahara, and Junko Kano.

Plot summary

Cast 
 Ryuji Shinagawa as Dr. Tsukioka, the Invisible Man
 Yoshiro Kitahara as Chief Inspector Wakabayashi
 Junko Kano as Akiko Hayakawa
 Yoshihiro Hamaguchi as Detective Hayama
 Shozo Nanbu as Dr. Hayakawa
 Joji Tsurumi as Sugimoto, Dr. Hayakawa's Assistant
 Bontaro Miake as Chief of the Metropolitan Police
 Ichirō Izawa as Kōkichi Kusunoki, the Human Fly
 Chujo Shizuo as Yamada, the Human Fly
 Naoko Matsudaira as Noriko Maeda

Release 
The film and its precessor were never released outside of Japan until Arrow Video released the film on Blu-ray on March 15, 2021.

See also 
 List of Japanese films of 1957
 List of science fiction films of the 1950s
 The Fly (1958)

References

External links 
 
 
 The Invisible Man vs. The Human Fly at the Japanese Movie Database

1957 films
1950s Japanese-language films
Films shot in Tokyo
Japanese science fiction films
1950s science fiction films
Films about invisibility
Japanese horror films
1957 horror films
Daiei Film tokusatsu films
Daiei Film films
1950s Japanese films